Alfred James Hipkins FSA (17 June 1826, Westminster – 3 June 1903, Kensington) was an English musician, musicologist and musical antiquary.

In 1840, at the age of 14, Hipkins became an apprentice piano tuner in the pianoforte factory of John Broadwood & Sons Ltd. In 1846, he was charged with training all of Broadwood's tuners in equal temperament, as many were still using the older meantone system. In 1849, he was named to the status of "senior workman," and he remained an employee of this company for the rest of his life. Despite having very limited musical training on the pianoforte and the organ, he gained a reputation for his performances of Chopin's music. He wrote many reviews of books on musical ethnology or musical antiquity for The Athenæum and The Musical Times. In 1891 he gave the Cantor lectures on Musical instruments, their construction and capabilities to the Royal Society of Arts.

Hipkins married in October 1850 and the marriage produced a son John, who became a noted wood-engraver, and a daughter Edith, who became a highly successful portrait painter.

Hipkins, Carl Engel and Thomas Taphouse created three of the outstanding antiquarian collections of musical instruments in the U.K.
According to his will, the Royal Institution received his collection of tuning forks and the Royal College of Music received his collection of musical instruments.

Selected works

 reprinted in 1975 with an introduction by Edwin M. Ripin
 reprinted in

References

External links

1826 births
1903 deaths
British classical organists
British male organists
British harpsichordists
British performers of early music
British keyboardists
British musicologists
Piano tuners
19th-century classical musicians
19th-century British male musicians
Male classical organists
19th-century organists
19th-century musicologists